Wright Upper Glacier is an ice apron at the upper west end of Wright Valley in Asgard Range, Antarctica. It is formed by a glacier flowing east from the inland ice plateau. Named by the Victoria University of Wellington Antarctic Expedition (VUWAE) (1958–59) for C.S. Wright, a member of the British Antarctic Expedition (1910–13), after whom the "Wright Glacier" (adjusted to Wright Lower Glacier by the VUWAE) was named.

Vortex Col is a col leading from the plateau into the south side of the glacier. At this locality, winds carrying clouds of snow from the polar plateau are deflected by Mount Fleming and funneled down this depression. The descriptive name was given by New Zealand Antarctic Place-Names Committee (NZ-APC).

References 

Glaciers of the Asgard Range
McMurdo Dry Valleys